Ángel Muñoz García (born 11 September 1994), better known by his stage name Jordi "El Niño Polla" (The Dick Boy), often shortened to Jordi ENP, is a Spanish pornographic actor, producer and YouTuber who rose to prominence after working with the production company Brazzers.

In 2018 and 2019, García received the Pornhub Award for Most Popular Male Performer two consecutive years in a row. As of 20 June 2021, his YouTube channel has amassed over 4 million subscribers and 396 million views.

Career
García first became interested in acting in adult films at the age of 18 after seeing an advertisement for models on the internet. After submitting photos of himself, he began acting and producing for the company FaKings in 2013. While working for the company, García received the nickname "El Niño Polla" (Spanish for "The Dick Boy") from one of the producers due to his small frame and youthful appearance.

In March 2016, García was contacted via Twitter about making content for the production company Brazzers. After one of his scenes became the company's most watched video of the year, he was offered an exclusive contract. In early 2017, Vice News attributed his success among several other young male porn actors who are associated as being part of the rise in MILF pornography. That same year, he received an AVN Award nomination for Best Male Newcomer.

YouTube Channel
On 27 October 2017, García created an official YouTube channel. His first upload received over 25 million views. In less than two months, García's channel received the Gold Play Button, a YouTube achievement for surpassing 1,000,000 subscribers. As of 13 May 2021, his channel has amassed over 4 million subscribers and 393 million views.

Personal life
García was born and raised in Ciudad Real, Spain. In an interview, he revealed that he doesn't smoke and rarely drinks. In 2018, García revealed that he has been dating a woman outside the pornographic industry since June 2016.

Awards and nominations

References

External links

 
 
 
 

1994 births
21st-century Spanish male actors
Male actors from Castilla–La Mancha
Living people
People from Ciudad Real
Spanish male film actors
Spanish male pornographic film actors
Spanish pornographic film producers
Spanish YouTubers
Video bloggers
Male bloggers